Thiago Moisés (born 23 March 1995) is a Brazilian mixed martial artist who currently competes in the Lightweight division of the Ultimate Fighting Championship. He has been a professional MMA competitor since 2012. Previously, he  competed for the promotions RFA and LFA.

Background
The son of a professional mixed martial artist, Thiago began training Brazilian jiu-jitsu at the age of eight.

Mixed martial arts career

RFA Lightweight champion
Moisés made his professional MMA debut on May 19, 2012. He would go on to amass a 5–1 record, before signing with Resurrection Fighting Alliance.

Moisés made his RFA debut against Javon Wright at RFA 28 on August 7, 2015. He won the fight by a second-round rear naked choke submission.

In his second fight with the promotion, Moisés was scheduled to face Zach Juusola for the vacant RFA Lightweight Championship at RFA 35 on February 19, 2016. Juusola later withdrew from the bout due to an injury, and was replaced by David Castillo who moved up from the co-main event fight with David Putvin. Moisés won the fight with a second-round helicopter armbar submission.

Moisés was scheduled to make his first title defense against Jamall Emmers at RFA 38 on June 3, 2016. He won the fight by a fifth-round technical knockout.

Moisés was scheduled to make his second title defense against Zach Freeman at RFA 44 on September 30, 2016. Moisés dominated almost every round of the bout, winning the fight by unanimous decision, with scores of 49–46, 49–46, 50–45.

Legacy Fighting Alliance
RFA and LFC merged in early 2017 to form Legacy Fighting Alliance. Accordingly, Moisés was given the opportunity to fight for the inaugural LFA lightweight title against Robert Watley at LFA 17 on July 21, 2017. Watley won the fight by unanimous decision, with all three judges awarding him every round of the bout.

Moisés was scheduled to face Jeff Peterson at LFA 41 on June 1, 2018. He won the fight by a second-round guillotine choke submission.

Dana White Contender Series
Moisés made his Tuesday Night Contender Series debut on August 11, 2018, at Dana White's Contender Series Brazil 3. He faced Gleidson Moraes and won the fight via knockout. The win earned Moisés a spot in the UFC.

Ultimate Fighting Championship
In his UFC debut Moisés faced against Beneil Dariush on November 10, 2018, at UFC Fight Night 139. He lost the fight via unanimous decision.

Moisés faced Kurt Holobaugh on May 11, 2019, at UFC 237. He won the fight by unanimous decision.

Moisés faced Damir Ismagulov on August 31, 2019, at UFC Fight Night 157. He lost the fight via unanimous decision after getting knocked down in the first round.

Moisés faced Michael Johnson on May 13, 2020, at UFC Fight Night: Smith vs. Teixeira. He won the fight via a heel hook submission in round two.

Moisés was scheduled to face Jalin Turner on September 5, 2020, at UFC Fight Night 176. However, on September 5, 2020, Moisés tested positive for Covid-19 and the bout against Turner was cancelled.

Moisés faced Bobby Green on October 31, 2020, at UFC Fight Night 181. He won the fight via unanimous decision.

Moisés faced Alexander Hernandez on February 27, 2021, at UFC Fight Night 186. He won the fight via unanimous decision.

Moisés faced Islam Makhachev on July 17, 2021, at UFC on ESPN 26. He lost the fight via a rear-naked choke submission in the fourth round.

Moisés faced Joel Álvarez on November 13, 2021, at UFC Fight Night 197. At the weigh-ins, Álvarez weighed in at 157.5 pounds, one and a half pounds over the lightweight non-title fight limit. The bout proceeded at a catchweight with Álvarez fined 30% of his purse, which went to Moisés. Moisés lost the fight via technical knockout in round one.

Moisés faced Christos Giagos at UFC on ESPN 38 on June 25, 2022. He won the fight via a rear-naked choke submission in the first round.  This win earned him his first Performance of the Night bonus award.

Moisés was scheduled to face Guram Kutateladze in January 21, 2023 at UFC 283. However, Kutateladze pulled out in early January for undisclosed reasons.  He was replaced by promotional newcomer Melquizael Costa. He won the fight via a neck face submission in the second round.

Personal life
Moisés is married.

Championships and accomplishments

Mixed martial arts
Ultimate Fighting Championship
Performance of the Night (One time)

Mixed martial arts record

|-
|Win
|align=center|17–6
|Melquizael Costa
|Submission (face crank)
|UFC 283
|
|align=center|2
|align=center|4:05
|Rio de Janeiro, Brazil
|
|-
|Win
|align=center|16–6
|Christos Giagos
|Submission (rear-naked choke)
|UFC on ESPN: Tsarukyan vs. Gamrot
|
|align=center|1
|align=center|3:05
|Las Vegas, Nevada, United States
|
|-
|Loss
|align=center|15–6
|Joel Álvarez
|TKO (elbows and punches)
|UFC Fight Night: Holloway vs. Rodríguez
|
|align=center|1
|align=center|3:01
|Las Vegas, Nevada, United States
|
|-
|Loss
|align=center|15–5
|Islam Makhachev
|Submission (rear-naked choke)
|UFC on ESPN: Makhachev vs. Moisés 
|
|align=center|4
|align=center|2:38
|Las Vegas, Nevada, United States
|
|-
|Win
|align=center|15–4
|Alexander Hernandez
|Decision (unanimous)
|UFC Fight Night: Rozenstruik vs. Gane
|
|align=center|3
|align=center|5:00
|Las Vegas, Nevada, United States
|
|-
|Win
|align=center|14–4
|Bobby Green
|Decision (unanimous)
|UFC Fight Night: Hall vs. Silva
|
|align=center|3
|align=center|5:00
|Las Vegas, Nevada, United States
|
|-
|Win
|align=center|13–4
|Michael Johnson
|Submission (achilles lock)
|UFC Fight Night: Smith vs. Teixeira 
|
|align=center|2
|align=center|0:25
|Jacksonville, Florida, United States
|
|-
|Loss
|align=center|12–4
|Damir Ismagulov
|Decision (unanimous)
|UFC Fight Night: Andrade vs. Zhang 
|
|align=center|3
|align=center|5:00
|Shenzhen, China
|
|-
|Win
|align=center|12–3
|Kurt Holobaugh
|Decision (unanimous)
|UFC 237
|
|align=center|3
|align=center|5:00
|Rio de Janeiro, Brazil
|
|-
|Loss
|align=center|11–3
|Beneil Dariush
|Decision (unanimous)
|UFC Fight Night: The Korean Zombie vs. Rodríguez
| 
|align=center|3
|align=center|5:00
|Denver, Colorado, United States
|
|-
|Win
|align=center|11–2
|Gleidson Cutis
|KO (head kick)
|Dana White's Contender Series Brazil 3
|
|align=center|1
|align=center|4:21
|Las Vegas, Nevada, United States
|
|-
|Win
|align=center|10–2
|Jeff Peterson
|Submission (guilotine choke)
|LFA 41
|
|align=center|2
|align=center|4:31
|Prior Lake, Minnesota, United States
|
|-
|Loss
|align=center|9–2
|Robert Watley
|Decision (unanimous)
|LFA 17
|
|align=center|5
|align=center|5:00
|Charlotte, North Carolina, United States
|
|-
|Win
|align=center|9–1
|Zach Freeman
|Decision (unanimous)
|RFA 44
|
|align=center|5
|align=center|5:00
|St. Charles, Missouri, United States
|
|-
|Win
|align=center|8–1
|Jamall Emmers
|TKO (punches)
|RFA 38
|
|align=center|5
|align=center|2:52
|Costa Mesa, California, United States
|
|-
|Win
|align=center|7–1
|David Castillo
|Submission (armbar)
|RFA 35
|
|align=center|2
|align=center|3:19
|Orem, Utah, United States
|
|-
|Win
|align=center|6–1
|Javon Wright 
|Submission (rear-naked choke)
|RFA 28
|
|align=center|2
|align=center|2:10
|St. Louis, Missouri, United States
|
|-
|Loss
|align=center|5–1
|Jason Knight
|Decision (unanimous)
|Atlas Fights: Cage Rage 25
|
|align=center|3
|align=center|5:00
|Biloxi, Mississippi, United States
|
|-
|Win
|align=center|5–0
|Francivaldo Trinaldo
|Submission (triangle armbar) 
|Fighten Decagon MMA
|
|align=center|3
|align=center|1:58
|Londrina, Brazil
|
|-
|Win
|align=center|4–0
|Leonardo de Oliveira Guarizzo
|Decision (unanimous) 
|Talent MMA Circuit 2
|
|align=center|3
|align=center|5:00
|Indaiatuba, Brazil
|
|-
|Win
|align=center|3–0
|José Conceição
|Decision (Unanimous)
|Real Fight 9
|
|align=center|3
|align=center|5:00
|São José dos Campos, Brazil
|
|-
|Win
|align=center|2–0
|Dennis Bentes 
|KO (head kick)
|Eco Combat 2 
|
|align=center|1
|align=center|0:23
|Indaiatuba, Brazil
|
|-
|Win
|align=center|1–0
|Wellingon Dias
|Submission (armbar)
|CT Fight
|
|align=center|1
|align=center|2:50
|Indaiatuba, Brazil
|

See also
 List of current UFC fighters
 List of male mixed martial artists

References

External links
 
 

Living people
1995 births
Brazilian male mixed martial artists
Mixed martial artists utilizing Brazilian jiu-jitsu
Sportspeople from São Paulo (state)
Ultimate Fighting Championship male fighters
Brazilian practitioners of Brazilian jiu-jitsu
People awarded a black belt in Brazilian jiu-jitsu
People from Indaiatuba